Metridioidea is a superfamily of sea anemones in the order Actiniaria.

Families in the superfamily Metridioidea include:

 Family Acontiophoridae
 Family Acricoactinidae
 Family Actinoscyphiidae
 Family Aiptasiidae
 Family Aiptasiomorphidae
 Family Aliciidae
 Family Amphianthidae
 Family Andvakiidae
 Family Antipodactinidae
 Family Bathyphelliidae
 Family Boloceroididae
 Family Diadumenidae
 Family Gonactiniidae
 Family Halcampidae
 Family Haliactinidae
 Family Hormathiidae
 Family Isanthidae
 Family Kadosactinidae
 Family Metridiidae
 Family Nemanthidae
 Family Nevadneidae
 Family Octineonidae
 Family Ostiactinidae
 Family Phelliidae
 Family Sagartiidae
 Family Sagartiomorphidae
 Family Spongiactinidae

References

 
Enthemonae
Animal superfamilies